Harpalus antonowi is a species of ground beetle in the subfamily Harpalinae. It was described by Tschitscherine in 1898.

References

antonowi
Beetles described in 1898